The American Sanctuary Association (ASA) is a 501(c)(3) nonprofit organization founded in 1998 to set standards for animal care and housing. The goal of ASA is to link together sanctuary directors and founders in order to share experiences and to enable unwanted and wild unreleasable animals to find safe haven. The ASA is headquartered in Las Vegas, Nevada, United States.

History 

ASA was founded in 1998 in large part to fill the role for animal sanctuaries that the Association of Zoos and Aquariums fills for zoos, and in disagreement with the prevailing accreditation standards. Actress and animal activist Tippi Hedren, founder of the Shambala Preserve, was elected as the first President, and still serves in that role. Vernon Weir was ASA's first Executive Director and served in that role for 22 years. ASA has not announced who will be taking over his duties following his death in December of 2021.

Accreditation 

ASA serves as an accrediting body for animal sanctuaries, ensuring that ASA accrediting facilities meet higher standards of animal care than required by U.S. law. As of 2019, the ASA has 50 accredited sanctuaries in the United States.

To receive accreditation by the ASA, a sanctuary must first submit an application demonstrating that it meets the ASA's criteria. Once the application receives preliminary approval, ASA conducts a site visit before granting accreditation. Among other things, the ASA looks at the sanctuary's financials, nonprofit status, APHIS inspection reports, habitat designs, food prep areas, staff and board of directors, emergency procedures, and general condition of the sanctuary and its inhabitants.

Placement 

ASA does not have a sanctuary facility of its own, but assists accredited sanctuaries with animal placement. Unlike wildlife rehabilitation centers, wildlife sanctuaries provide homes to wild animals that have been deemed non-releasable, usually due to injuries or habituation to humans. Some animal sanctuaries specialize in wildlife; others work with domestic animals and livestock. ASA can help to find the right sanctuary to house specific animals in need of homes.

See also 
 Global Federation of Animal Sanctuaries

References

External links 
 

Animal sanctuaries
Wildlife sanctuaries
Wildlife sanctuaries of the United States
Trade associations based in the United States